Sias Koen (born 1 January 1994) is a South African rugby union player for the  in Pro14 on loan from  in the Currie Cup and in the Rugby Challenge. He is a utility forward that can play as a flanker, number eight or a lock.

Rugby career

2010–2011 : Schoolboy rugby

Koen was born in Bloemfontein, but grew up in the North West province.

In 2011, Koen was named in the Leopards team that competed at the foremost rugby union competition at high school level in South Africa, the Under-18 Craven Week. He again scored two tries during the tournament, both in a 17–40 defeat to Eastern Province Country Districts.

2013 : Leopards Under-19

In 2013, Koen was included in the  squad that participated in the Under-19 Provincial Championship. Koen also started the semi-final against , but the team from Pretoria won 37–21 to end the Leopards' interest in the competition.

2014–2015 : Sharks Under-21 and Vodacom Cup

For the 2014 season, Koen moved to Durban to join the  academy. The Sharks finished in fifth spot, failing to secure a semi-final berth.

At the start of 2015, Koen was included in the  squad for the Vodacom Cup competition.

Koen made four appearances for the  during the Under-21 Provincial Championship in the latter half of 2015, again scoring a try against his old side the Leopards in a 45–12 win.

2016–present : Griquas

In 2016, Koen joined .

References

South African rugby union players
Living people
1994 births
Rugby union players from Bloemfontein
Rugby union locks
Rugby union flankers
Rugby union number eights
Griquas (rugby union) players
Sharks (Currie Cup) players
Cheetahs (rugby union) players
AS Béziers Hérault players